Banares may refer to:

 Varanasi (sometimes transliterated: Banares), a city in Uttar Pradesh, India
 Bañares, a municipality in La Rioja, Spain